Operation Jumelles was a military operation which was part of the Algerian War in Kabylia, Algeria. It lasted from 22 July 1959 to March 1960. It was fought between the FLN and the French Army.

Overview
The first phase of the operation was called Pelvoux, and was fought between 22 July and 9 August. French marines led by the captain of the Sanguinetti frigate entered the Akfadou forest.

Conflicts in 1959
Conflicts in 1960
Jumelles
1959 in France
1960 in France
1959 in Algeria
1960 in Algeria
Battles involving the French Foreign Legion